The Ricaurte Province is a province of the Colombian Department of Boyacá. The province, named after independence hero Antonio Ricaurte, is formed by 13 municipalities.

Municipalities 
 Arcabuco
 Chitaraque
 Gachantivá
 Moniquirá
 Ráquira
 Sáchica
 San José de Pare
 Santa Sofía
 Santana
 Sutamarchán
 Tinjacá
 Togüí
 Villa de Leyva

References

External links 
  Boyaca Info; Provinces of Boyaca

Provinces of Boyacá Department